Los Lunas Public Schools is a school district based in Los Lunas, New Mexico.

Los Lunas Public Schools' attendance area includes, in addition to Los Lunas: Bosque Farms, Chical, El Cerro, El Cerro Mission, Highland Meadows, Meadow Lake, Monterey Park, Peralta, and Valencia. It also includes sections of the Isleta Pueblo and Belen, Las Maravillas, Los Chaves, and Tomé.

In 2005 the district had a total of 16 schools with approximately 8,500 students. It had 8 elementary, 3 intermediate, 2 middle, and 2 high schools, as well as 1 alternative high school.

Schools
 High schools 
 Los Lunas High School (grades 9-12)
 Valencia High School (grades 9-12)
 Century High School (alternative high school, grades 10-12)(previously known as Daniel Fernandez Intermediate School)

 Middle schools (Grades 7-8)
 Los Lunas Middle School
 Valencia Middle School (previously known as Manzano Vista Middle School)

 Elementary schools (Grades PreK through 6)
 Bosque Farms Elementary
 Desert View Elementary (previously known as Desert View Intermediate School)
 Raymond Gabaldon Elementary School (previously known as Raymond Gabaldon Intermediate School)
 Katherine Gallegos Elementary School
 Los Lunas Elementary School
 Peralta Elementary
 Ann Parish Elementary School
 Sundance Elementary
 Tomé Elementary
 Valencia Elementary

References

External links
 Los Lunas Schools

School districts in New Mexico
Education in Valencia County, New Mexico